Mario Salieri (born 29 November 1957 in Naples) is an Italian pornographic film director and producer.

Career
Salieri started his adult film career with semi-amateur films shot in Amsterdam for the Italian market. Since the early 1990s, he has directed and written many adult film titles. He is also the owner of the company Salieri Productions.

Awards (selected)
 2001 Venus Award winner - Italian National Prize
 2001 Ninfa Award winner - Best Director (Divina)
 2003 Venus Award winner - Best Director (Italy)
 2007 Ninfa Award winner - Best Director (La Viuda De La Camorra - Negro Y Azul)
 2008 European X Award – Best Director (Italy)
 2008 Ninfa Lifetime Career Award (Public) winner

Filmography (selected)

Inside Napoli (1989)
Roman Orgies - Italian Perversions (1990)
Discesa all'inferno (1991)
Napoli - Parigi, linea rovente 1 & 2 (1991)
Roma Connection (1991)
Arabika (1992)
Adolescenza perversa (1993)
Concetta Licata (1994)
Dracula (1994)
Sceneggiata napoletana (1994)
Eros e Tanatos (1995)
La Clinica della vergogna (1995)
Casino (2001) 
Faust (2002)
La Dolce Vita (2003)
La Ciociara - Fuga da Roma (2017)

See also
The following listing includes related award-winning directors of adult erotic films:

 Andrew Blake
 Bill Osco
 Michael Ninn
 Philip Mond
 Radley Metzger
 Tinto Brass

References

External links
 
 
 
 .
 .

Italian pornographic film directors
Living people
1957 births
Italian pornographic film producers
Film people from Naples